Thomas W. "Tom" Simpson is a scholar, teacher, and writer in the fields of religion, human rights, and social justice. Born in 1975 in Olean, New York, he earned his bachelor's degree in religious studies and classics from the University of Virginia, his Master of Theological Studies degree from Emory University, and his Ph.D. in religious studies (specializing in European and American religious history) from the University of Virginia. He currently teaches seminars on human rights, the Holocaust, Islam, religion and global feminism, existentialist literature and philosophy, religion and popular culture, and U.S. religious history at Phillips Exeter Academy. 

Simpson's first book, American Universities and the Birth of Modern Mormonism, 1867-1940, won the Mormon History Association's Best Book Award. A non-Mormon, Simpson studies religious diversity, conflict, and coexistence in the U.S. and abroad. J. Spencer Fluhman called Simpson's book "an elegant, original contribution and a must-read for anyone interested in American religion and the life of the mind."

Simpson's other published writings focus on the religious, political, and cultural landscapes of postwar Bosnia and Herzegovina. His nonfiction essays All We Have Left (2014) and Recovery's Rhythm and Blues (2016)  have appeared in the Canadian literary magazine Numéro Cinq.

References

1975 births
Living people
American educators
American male writers
Emory University alumni
Phillips Exeter Academy faculty
University of Virginia alumni